Mallorca Son Moix Stadium is a football stadium located in Palma de Mallorca, Balearic Islands, Spain, and serves as the home ground of RCD Mallorca. It is the largest stadium in the Balearic Islands and the 26th largest in Spain. Since the 2020 COVID-19 pandemic it was known as 'Visit Mallorca Stadium' having being re-named in a partnership with Consell de Mallorca to help resume the tourist activities on the island -its main resource.

The stadium is located in the Can Valero industrial zone in north-west Palma, 3 km from the city center and 13 km from the airport. It can be seen from the Vía de Cintura, Palma's urban motorway. Previously known as the Son Moix Stadium, the Iberostar Stadium and the Ono Estadi, the stadium was built for the 1999 Summer Universiade. In 1999, RCD Mallorca obtained an agreement with the city council to use it for the next 50 years, replacing their previous stadium, Estadio Lluís Sitjar.

The stadium can hold 23,142 spectators, making it the biggest stadium in the Balearic Islands. It has a bowl shape design with two of the stands having two tiers. The stadium was designed to allow for further development of both ends, eventually creating a fully two-tiered stadium with a capacity of over 40,000. These plans now look unlikely as further detailed below. A small temporary stand is sometimes erected on the athletics track; this can be removed for athletics events.

International games
The Spain national football team has played three international matches at the stadium, the most recent was on October 11, 2013 against Belarus in a 2014 World Cup qualifying match. Spain won this fixture 21.

Future
Any future improvement plans seem to be on hold, with RCD Mallorca preferring to explore the construction of a new stadium. This is in part to the club and their landlords being in disagreement over improvements to the existing stadium.

References

External links

Estadios de Espana 

RCD Mallorca
Football venues in the Balearic Islands
Sports venues completed in 1999
1999 establishments in Spain
Buildings and structures in Palma de Mallorca